Phelan Sheppard are musicians Keiron Phelan and David Sheppard. They are based in London, England, and play mainly instrumental music. Phelan and Sheppard have long been associated with each other, having first met as teenagers with a mutual appreciation of Can, Cluster and Brian Eno and formed a band.

In 1996, the pair united after some time in other projects. This partnership recorded under their own names and, with percussionist Jon Steele, as State River Widening.

Sheppard is also a founder member of Ellis Island Sound and is a member of Smile Down Upon Us, The Wisdom of Harry, and Continental Film Night. Phelan is founder member of Smile Down Upon Us (with Japanese singer moomLooo) and is a member of Orla Wren. Both have collaborated with numerous other musicians and undertake arrangement and production work. Their music has been widely featured on television.

Originally styling themselves as Keiron Phelan, David Sheppard they released the album O Little Stars on Rocket Girl in 2002.
Subsequently, Phelan Sheppard released the album, Harps Old Master, on The Leaf Label in 2006.
A collaborative single with Niandra Ladies on Static Caravan was released in 2007.

References

English electronic music duos
English folk musical groups
Musical groups from London
Rocket Girl artists